Persistence of Vision is a 2012 documentary film based on animator Richard Williams' ill-fated attempts to produce his film The Thief and the Cobbler. Directed by Kevin Schreck, its tagline is "the untold story of the greatest animated film never made". The film premiered in Canada on 4 October 2012 at the Vancouver International Film Festival.

Synopsis
Canadian animator and filmmaker Richard Williams struggles to finish his masterpiece, a long-term vanity project called The Thief and the Cobbler. Originally begun in 1964 as an adaptation of middle-eastern folk tales, the project continues to grow in scope and complexity over several decades while Williams and his studio seek proper funding. In 1988, Williams is hired as animation director on the hit film Who Framed Roger Rabbit, and his long-laboured project is finally given the greenlight by Warner Bros.

Unfortunately, Williams' meticulous attention to detail, as well as the forthcoming release of Disney's similarly themed Aladdin, prove too much for the studio, and on May 15, 1992, after three decades of work, Williams and his team are fired from the project. The film is then recut and hastily released in various editions that bear little resemblance to Williams' original vision. Williams himself retires from animation and refuses to speak about the film for several years after. He eventually releases a bestselling instructional book, The Animator's Survival Kit, and becomes a legendary mentor and instructor to a whole new generation of animators.

Though Williams did not participate in the making of the film, archival footage of him is combined with interviews of his co-workers.

Cast
 Omar Ali-Shah (archive footage)
 Art Babbitt (archive footage)
 Howard Blake  
 Richard Burdett  
 John Culhane  
 Antonia Dewhurst  
 Greg Duffell  
 Charles Fleischer (archive footage)
 Julianna Franchetti  
 Ken Harris (archive footage)
 Roy Jackson (archive footage)
 Chris Knott  
 Ramon Modiano  
 Roy Naisbitt (archive footage)
 Brent Odell  
 Philip Pepper  
 Michael Schlingmann  
 Richard Williams (archive footage)
 Robin Williams (archive footage)
 Robert Zemeckis (archive footage)

Reception
Drew Taylor of IndieWire called the film "a heartbreaking account" and a "Herculean accomplishment".  The Globe and Mail rated the film 3.5/4 stars and called the film "gripping". Jeff Shannon of The Seattle Times rated the film 3.5/4 stars and described it as "engrossing" and "surprisingly suspenseful".

Awards

|-
| 2013 
| Persistence of Vision
| Buffalo International Film Festival Audience Award for Best Of Festival
| 
|-
| 2013 
| Persistence of Vision
| Buffalo International Film Festival Audience Award for Best Documentary
| 
|}

See also
2012 in film
The King and the Mockingbird - the 1980 French animated film by Paul Grimault also similar in production time
List of films with longest production time

References

External links
 
 
Trailer on YouTube

2012 documentary films
2012 films
Documentary films about animation
Documentary films about unfinished films
Canadian documentary films
American documentary films
British documentary films
2010s English-language films
2010s American films
2010s Canadian films
2010s British films
English-language Canadian films